Johannes van den Broek (26 October 1882, Haarlem – 22 October 1946, The Hague) was a businessman and Dutch minister of finance from 1942 to 1945. He was chairman of the Biliton Company in the Dutch East Indies from 1931, and in 1942 he was appointed minister of finance of the Dutch government-in-exile in London. In 1944-45 he also was minister of economic affairs.

External links

 Biography (in Dutch)

1882 births
1946 deaths
Ministers of Finance of the Netherlands
Ministers of Economic Affairs of the Netherlands
Dutch civil servants
Dutch civil engineers
Dutch people of World War II
Politicians from Haarlem
Independent politicians in the Netherlands
Dutch people of the Dutch East Indies